Baume is a Richemont sustainable watch brand.

Background 
Baume launched on May 15, 2018 by the Switzerland-based luxury goods holding company, Richemont. The name comes from the mother brand Baume & Mercier. However, Baume is a new brand that operates independently. Baume watches are sold exclusively online and the brand only uses natural or recycled materials in the manufacturing process. Its headquarters are located in Meyrin, in the canton of Geneva, Switzerland. Baume watches are designed in Geneva and assembled in Amsterdam. The brand uses quartz and $15 automatic movements, made by the Swiss group Ronda and Myota, a Japanese company. As of June 2020, the Baume brand merged with the established Richemont subsidiary Baume & Mercier and will offer full customer services to anyone who bought a Baume watch. Also, production moved to Baume & Mercier's workshop in Les Brenets.

Products

Custom Timepieces Edition 
This is a fully customisable watch, designed through an online configurator with over 2000 permutations.

Iconic Series 
This watch is the brand's flagship. The product is updated seasonally, this automatic movement is crafted in a recycled, recyclable aluminum case with a 100% recycled PET bracelet.

Limited Edition 
BAUME launched its first Upcycled Limited Edition watch  made out of Erik Ellington's  old skate boards 

BAUME launched in February 2019 its second Upcycled Limited Edition, made out of unused ski materials.

Aesthetic Features 
The crowns of Baume watches sit at a 12 o’clock position – a feature that references the first pocket watches produced by Baume & Mercier. The watches are genderless and they have interchangeable straps to allow the wearer to change easily the look of the watch.

References 

Swiss watch brands
Richemont brands
Swiss companies established in 2018
Manufacturing companies established in 2018